Waipareira was a New Zealand parliamentary electorate that existed for one parliamentary term from 1996 to 1999. Located in West Auckland, it was held by Brian Neeson of the New Zealand National Party, who had narrowly beaten Labour's Chris Carter.

Population centres
The 1996 election was notable for the significant change of electorate boundaries, based on the provisions of the Electoral Act 1993. Because of the introduction of the mixed-member proportional (MMP) electoral system, the number of electorates had to be reduced, leading to significant changes. More than half of the electorates contested in 1996 were newly constituted, and most of the remainder had seen significant boundary changes. In total, 73 electorates were abolished, 29 electorates were newly created (including Waipareira), and 10 electorates were recreated, giving a net loss of 34 electorates.

The electorate includes the following population centres:
 Te Atatū Peninsula
 Massey

History
Neeson narrowly defeated Labour's Chris Carter, who became an MP three years later in 1999.

Neeson transferred back to the Waitakere electorate and represented it for another term.

Members of Parliament
Key

List MPs
Members of Parliament elected from party lists in elections where that person also unsuccessfully contested the Waipareira electorate. Unless otherwise stated, all MPs terms began and ended at general elections.

Election results

1996 election

References

Historical electorates of New Zealand
1996 establishments in New Zealand
1999 disestablishments in New Zealand